is a Japanese politician, attorney. A native of Nobeoka, Miyazaki, she has been a member of the House of Councillors since 1998, was re-elected in 2004 and 2010,
and was the head of the Social Democratic Party of Japan (SDP), from 2003 to 2013. She was elected as the leader of the party for a second time in February 2020.

Education and career before politics

After graduating from the University of Tokyo with a Bachelor of Laws degree, she became a lawyer in 1987. She was a Visiting Professor at Gakushuin Women's College.

Political career and political views

Fukushima was also Minister of State for Consumer Affairs and Food Safety, Social Affairs, and Gender Equality in Prime Minister Yukio Hatoyama's cabinet (16 September 2009 – 28 May 2010); the SDP was the junior partner in the DPJ-led government coalition. However, in May 2010 disagreements over the issue of the Marine Corps Air Station Futenma led to the sacking of Fukushima from the cabinet on 28 May and the SDP subsequently voted to leave the ruling coalition.

Fukushima's Social Democratic Party has an anti-nuclear platform, and she has been referred to as a prominent anti-nuclear activist. For three decades, she was at the forefront of an often futile fight against the utilities that operated Japan's nuclear reactors, the corporations that built them and the bureaucrats who enabled them. That situation changed with the Fukushima Daiichi nuclear disaster in March 2011.

She has opposed capital punishment on the SDP website.

After a disappointing result in the 2013 election for the House of Councillors she announced her resignation as head of the party.

Fukushima was elected as the leader of the Social Democratic Party on 22 February 2020.

Fukushima was recipient of Knights of the Ordre national du Mérite in December 2020.

See also
Katsumi Furitsu

References

External links 
  
 Official blog 

1955 births
Living people
People from Miyazaki Prefecture
University of Tokyo alumni
Japanese women lawyers
Japanese feminists
Japanese anti–death penalty activists
Female members of the House of Councillors (Japan)
Women government ministers of Japan
Social Democratic Party (Japan) politicians
Japanese anti–nuclear power activists
Knights of the Ordre national du Mérite
20th-century Japanese women politicians
21st-century Japanese women politicians